Frank Urban "Fuzzy" Zoeller Jr. (born November 11, 1951) is an American professional golfer who has won ten PGA Tour events including two major championships. He is one of three golfers to have won the Masters Tournament in his first appearance in the event. He also won the 1984 U.S. Open, which earned him the 1985 Bob Jones Award.

Life and career
Born and raised in New Albany, Indiana, Zoeller was successful golfer while at New Albany High School, finishing as the runner-up in the 1970 state high school tournament with a state record low round (67). After completing his high school career, he attended Edison Junior College in Florida, transferred to the University of Houston, and became a professional golfer in 1973. Zoeller won both of his two majors in playoffs: the 1979 Masters at Augusta National Golf Club in a three-way sudden-death playoff with Ed Sneed and Tom Watson; and the 1984 U.S. Open at Winged Foot Golf Club after an 18-hole playoff with Greg Norman.

In 1979, Zoeller became the first golfer since 1935 to win The Masters in his first appearance in the event. The only two other golfers to have won The Masters on their debut at Augusta were the winners of the first two Masters tournaments Horton Smith and Gene Sarazen, in 1934 and 1935 respectively. It was the first sudden-death playoff at The Masters; the previous six playoffs were 18-hole rounds on Monday (except 1935, which was 36 holes).

For much of his career, Zoeller was famous for waving a white towel in mock surrender from the fairway of the 72nd hole of the 1984 U.S. Open, after Greg Norman holed a long putt on the 72nd green to tie Zoeller for the tournament lead. At the end of the 18-hole playoff the next day between Norman and Zoeller (which Zoeller won by 8 strokes), Norman waved a white towel himself, returning the joke.

Zoeller was voted the 1985 winner of the Bob Jones Award, the highest honor given by the United States Golf Association in recognition of distinguished sportsmanship in golf.

Zoeller shared the 54-hole lead in the 1994 Open Championship after a 3rd round of 64, but finished the tournament in 3rd place, his best-ever finish in The Open. Zoeller missed an 8-foot birdie putt on the 18th green in his 3rd round at Turnberry which would have tied the record for the best single round at The Open.

He competed at the 1979, 1983 and 1985 Ryder Cups.

In 2002, Zoeller joined the Champions Tour and won the Senior PGA Championship, a senior major, that year. He also won the 2004 MasterCard Championship.

Zoeller has often been jokingly critical of his colleagues on the golf course, for instance, asking "Where are the windmills and animals?" on a newly designed golf course, or heckling Craig Stadler, saying, "Nice clods, Stadler. Did you get those at a Buster Brown fire sale?"

In 2009, Zoeller began selling vodka under the brand name "Fuzzy's Vodka".  Starting in 2012, the brand sponsored Ed Carpenter Racing's entries in the IndyCar Series.

Remarks about Tiger Woods
At the 1997 Masters Tournament, Zoeller made remarks, described by some sections of the media as racist, regarding Tiger Woods. After finishing tied for 34th place with a score of 78, Zoeller, referring to the following year's Masters Champions Dinner, for which the defending champion selects the menu, said, "He's doing quite well, pretty impressive.  That little boy is driving well and he's putting well. He's doing everything it takes to win. So, you know what you guys do when he gets in here? You pat him on the back and say congratulations and enjoy it and tell him not to serve fried chicken next year. Got it." Zoeller then smiled, snapped his fingers, and walked away before turning and adding, "or collard greens or whatever the hell they serve." K-Mart and Dunlop ceased sponsoring Zoeller after the incident.

"I know Fuzzy, and it was obvious to me that he was attempting to be funny," fellow golf professional Tom Lehman said. "He probably would have said the same thing to Tiger's face and they both would have yukked it up...[But] it wasn't the best timing, and it wasn't in good taste. It's not appropriate."

"I've been on the tour for 23 years and anybody who knows me knows that I am a jokester," Zoeller said. "It's too bad that something I said in jest was turned into something it's not. But I didn't mean anything by it and I'm sorry if I offend anybody. If Tiger is offended by it, I apologize to him, too. I have nothing but the utmost respect for Tiger as a person and an athlete."

Zoeller later offered an apology directly to Woods, which Woods accepted.

Defamation lawsuit
On February 13, 2007, Zoeller sued Josef Silny & Associates, a foreign-credential evaluation firm based in Miami, Florida. The lawsuit alleged that defamatory statements appeared in the Wikipedia article about Zoeller in December 2006, originating from a computer at that firm. According to the suit, the edits suggested Zoeller had committed acts including alcohol, drug and domestic abuse. Defendant Josef Silny said a computer consultant would investigate. However, Zoeller dropped the lawsuit in December 2007 after being unsuccessful in finding the poster. Zoeller was unable to sue Wikipedia for the statements due to protections accorded to providers of "interactive computer services" under Section 230 of the Communications Decency Act.

Amateur wins (3)
1972 Florida State Junior College Championship (individual)
1973 Old Capital Invitational (Indiana)
1973 Indiana State Amateur

Professional wins (19)

PGA Tour wins (10)

*Note: The 1986 AT&T Pebble Beach National Pro-Am was shortened to 54 holes due to weather.

PGA Tour playoff record (2–2)

Other wins (4)
1985 Skins Game
1986 Skins Game
1987 Merrill Lynch Shoot-Out Championship
2003 Tylenol Par-3 Shootout

Champions Tour wins (2)

Other senior wins (3)
2002 Senior Slam
2008 Wendy's Champions Skins Game (with Peter Jacobsen)
2009 Wendy's Champions Skins Game (with Ben Crenshaw)

Major championships

Wins (2)

1Defeated Sneed and Watson in a sudden-death playoff - Zoeller 4-3 (−1), Sneed 4-4 (E) and Watson 4-4 (E).
2Defeated Norman in an 18-hole playoff - Zoeller 67 (–3), Norman 75 (+5).

Results timeline

CUT = missed the halfway cut (3rd round cut in 1979 Open Championship)
"T" indicates a tie for a place.

Summary

Most consecutive cuts made – 8 (1993 Masters – 1994 PGA)
Longest streak of top-10s – 2 (twice)

Results in The Players Championship

CUT = missed the halfway cut
"T" indicates a tie for a place

Champions Tour major championships

Wins (1)

U.S. national team appearances
Professional
Ryder Cup: 1979 (winners), 1983 (winners), 1985
Wendy's 3-Tour Challenge (representing Senior PGA Tour): 2001

See also 

 1974 PGA Tour Qualifying School graduates

References

External links

American male golfers
Houston Cougars men's golfers
PGA Tour golfers
PGA Tour Champions golfers
Winners of men's major golf championships
Winners of senior major golf championships
Ryder Cup competitors for the United States
Golfers from Indiana
People from New Albany, Indiana
New Albany High School (Indiana) alumni
1951 births
Living people